Abdel Hamid Sahil (born 20 February 1957) is an Algerian athlete. He competed in the men's high jump at the 1980 Summer Olympics.

References

External links
 

1957 births
Living people
Athletes (track and field) at the 1980 Summer Olympics
Algerian male high jumpers
Olympic athletes of Algeria
Place of birth missing (living people)
21st-century Algerian people